Cynthia L. Haven is an American literary scholar, author, critic, Slavicist, and journalist. Her books include Evolution of Desire: A Life of René Girard, which the San Francisco Chronicle named one of the top books of 2018, and Czesław Miłosz: A California Life. She is a National Endowment for the Humanities Public Scholar. She has been a Milena Jesenská Journalism Fellow with the Institut für die Wissenschaften vom Menschen in Vienna and a visiting scholar at Stanford University's Division of Literatures, Cultures, and Languages while researching her book on French theorist René Girard. She was a Voegelin fellow at the Hoover Institution while working on her book on Nobel poet Joseph Brodsky and his translator, George L. Kline. She blogs at The Book Haven. She has written for a wide range of publications, including The Times Literary Supplement, The Washington Post, the Los Angeles Times, and The New York Times Book Review.

She studied with Joseph Brodsky and has won many literary and journalistic awards, including two Hopwood Awards and a Broomfield Essay Prize while at the University of Michigan.

Her Penguin Modern Classics anthology for the selected writings of René Girard will be published in April 2023, and a short German anthology was published in 2022 with the Leipzig publisher Reclam, for its popular "Was bedeutet das alles?" series.

Books 

 All Desire is a Desire for Being: Essential Writings (London: Penguin Modern Classics, 2023).
 Warum kämpfen wir? Und wie hören wir auf? (Leipzig: Reclam, 2022).
 Czesław Miłosz: A California Life (Berkeley: Heyday, 2021).
 The Man Who Brought Brodsky Into English: Conversations with George L. Kline (Boston: Academic Studies Press, 2021).
 Conversations with René Girard: Prophet of Envy (London: Bloomsbury, 2020).
 Evolution of Desire: A Life of René Girard, (Lansing: Michigan State University Press, 2018).
 Everything Came to Me at Once: The Intellectual Vision of René Girard(Belmont, NC: Wiseblood, 2017). An Invisible Rope: Portraits of Czesław Miłosz (Athens, Ohio: Swallow/Ohio University Press, 2011).
 Czesław Miłosz: Conversations, (Jackson: University Press of Mississippi, Literary Conversations Series, 2006).
 Three Poets in Conversation (London: Waywiser, 2006).
 Peter Dale in Conversation with Cynthia Haven London: Waywiser, 2005).
 Joseph Brodsky: Conversations'' (Jackson: University Press of Mississippi, Literary Conversations Series, 2003).

References

Interviews 

 "Cynthia Haven: From Envy to Forgiveness", Meditations with Zohar, Apple Podcasts, February 14, 2023.
 "Cynthia L. Haven on René Girard, Czeslaw Milosz, and Joseph Brodsky," Conversations with Tyler Cowen, Aug. 24, 2022
 "Czesław Miłosz: A California Life," Robert Pogue Harrison's "Entitled Opinions," July 25, 2022.
 "Czesław Miłosz: A California Life — A Conversation with Cynthia L. Haven,"  The Athenaeum Review, Episode 45, 2019. 
 "Cynthia Haven: Interview with Scott Beauchamp, "Full Stop: Reviews, Interviews, Marginalia," May 15, 2019.
 "René Girard and the Mysterious Nature of Desire", Johns Hopkins University The Hub, August 8, 2018.

Living people
1963 births
20th-century American women writers
American literary critics
American women journalists
American women critics
20th-century American biographers
American women biographers
21st-century American women